Toby Jackson (born October 18, 1986) is an American football defensive end for the Massachusetts Pirates of the National Arena League (NAL). He played college football at the University of Central Florida.

Early life
Jackson attended Griffin High School in Griffin, Georgia, where he was a standout defensive end on the football team. Jackson was heavily recruited out of high school, earning scholarship offers from Alabama, Auburn, Clemson, Georgia, Florida State, Ole Miss and Tennessee among others.

College career

Junior college
Jackson signed with Georgia out of high school, but after failing to qualify academically, Jackson enrolled at Hargrave Military Academy. After a year at Hargrave, Jackson could still not qualify academically, and enrolled at Navarro College. Jackson helped Navarro to a national championship during the 2010 season, earning MVP honors.

UCF
Jackson signed with UCF out of Navarro.

Professional career
After going undrafted in the 2013 NFL Supplemental Draft, Jackson signed with the Dallas Cowboys in July, 2013. Jackson was released after the Cowboys third preseason game.

Orlando Predators
In June 2015, Jackson signed with the Orlando Predators of the Arena Football League. Jackson appeared in 3 games for the Predators, recording a sack.

Spokane Empire
Jackson signed with the Spokane Empire of the Indoor Football League for the 2016 season.

Columbus Lions
On June 15, 2017, Jackson signed with the Columbus Lions. On August 30, 2017, Jackson re-signed with the Lions. On November 20, 2017, Jackson was released by the Lions.

Massachusetts Pirates
On March 26, 2018, Jackson signed with the Massachusetts Pirates.

References

External links
UCF Knights bio

1986 births
Living people
Players of American football from Georgia (U.S. state)
African-American players of American football
American football defensive ends
Navarro Bulldogs football players
UCF Knights football players
Orlando Predators players
Spokane Empire players
Columbus Lions players
Massachusetts Pirates players
People from Griffin, Georgia
21st-century African-American sportspeople
20th-century African-American people